Celebrity Silhouette is a  operated by Celebrity Cruises, a subsidiary of Royal Caribbean Group. She was ordered with German shipbuilder Meyer Werft in May 2007 and was delivered in July 2011 as the fourth Solstice-class ship in the fleet.

Design 
Celebrity Silhouette is built to the same design as her preceding three Solstice-class sister ships (Solstice, Equinox, and Eclipse), but measures approximately 400 tons larger and six feet longer. Upon completion, she had a capacity of 2,885 passengers.

Construction
In May 2007, Celebrity Cruises announced it had ordered its fourth Solstice-class ship with German shipbuilder Meyer Werft for a tentative fall 2011 debut. The vessel's name, Celebrity Silhouette, was announced on 21 December 2009. On 29 May 2011, the ship was floated out from the Meyer Werft shipyard in Papenburg, and was delivered to Celebrity Cruises on 18 July 2011. She sailed to Hamburg for her naming ceremony on 21 July 2011, where Michelle Morgan, president and CEO of Signature Travel Network, christened the vessel.

Service history 
On 23 July 2011, Celebrity Silhouette embarked on her maiden voyage to Civitavecchia, where she operated Mediterranean voyages for her maiden summer season. She moved in fall 2011 to the Cape Liberty Cruise Port in Bayonne, New Jersey, where she operated 12-night Caribbean itineraries to complete her inaugural year.

Celebrity Silhouette has since been homeported at Port Everglades in Fort Lauderdale, Florida during the winters, sailing a variety of Caribbean itineraries, and has been deployed to Southampton in the summers for sailings around Northern Europe and the Mediterranean.

Gallery

References

External links

Official website
Celebrity Silhouette Guide

Silhouette
2011 ships
Ships built in Papenburg